Hironao Meguro (born 18 May 1973) is a Japanese biathlete. He competed at the 1998 Winter Olympics and the 2002 Winter Olympics.

References

1973 births
Living people
Japanese male biathletes
Olympic biathletes of Japan
Biathletes at the 1998 Winter Olympics
Biathletes at the 2002 Winter Olympics
Sportspeople from Niigata Prefecture
Asian Games medalists in biathlon
Biathletes at the 2003 Asian Winter Games
Asian Games gold medalists for Japan
Medalists at the 2003 Asian Winter Games